Saurabh Singh (born 25 July 1974) is an Indian Politician and current Member of Legislative Assembly for Akaltara. He is a member of Bharatiya Janata Party.

Political career
Singh first contested 2008 Assembly election from Akaltara on Bahujan Samaj Party's ticket and won. In July 2013, Saurabh left Bahujan Samaj Party. He joined Indian National Congress in 2013 and left in 2014. He joined  Bharatiya Janata Party in 2014 and contested 2018 Assembly election on BJP ticket and was again elected as MLA by defeating Richa Jogi (daughter in law of former CM Ajit Jogi).

References

Bharatiya Janata Party politicians from Chhattisgarh
Chhattisgarh MLAs 2008–2013
1974 births
Living people
Chhattisgarh MLAs 2018–2023